The 2012 Vuelta a España started on 18 August 2012 and was the 67th edition of the race. The race began in Pamplona with a team time trial and ended on 9 September, as traditional, in Madrid. The 2012 edition saw the return of the Bola del Mundo mountain top finish. It was the venue of an exciting battle between winner Vincenzo Nibali and runner-up Ezequiel Mosquera in the 2010 edition. It was the first time since 1994 that the race visited the region of Navarre. The previous time that Pamplona was visited by a Grand Tour in 1996, when the city hosted the finish of a memorable stage of the 1996 Tour de France. On that occasion, the race paid homage to Miguel Indurain by passing through his home village of Villava en route.

Contador, who won the seventeenth stage of the race after a solo attack, won the general classification by 1' 16" over runner-up Alejandro Valverde of the  team. Two-time stage winner Valverde also won two sub-classifications on the final day; by taking a sixth-place finish on the stage into Madrid, he overhauled the points tally of Joaquim Rodríguez in that classification, and their resultant switch of positions, allowed Valverde to take the combination classification – where the lowest cumulative score across the general, points and mountains classifications wins – as well.

Completing an all-Spanish podium, Rodríguez finished the race third overall, 21 seconds behind Valverde and 1' 37" behind Contador, having led the race for 13 days between the fourth and sixteenth stages. Rodríguez also achieved three stage victories, a tally second only to  sprinter John Degenkolb who won five stages, the most by a German at the Vuelta. 's Simon Clarke became the second Australian to win the mountains classification in a Grand Tour, while the  comfortably won the teams classification.

Teams 

The 18 UCI ProTour teams were automatically entitled to start the race and were joined by four teams that received a wildcard in April 2012.

The 18 ProTour teams:

Teams receiving a wildcard:
 
 
 
 

For more details, see List of teams and cyclists in the 2012 Vuelta a España.

Pre-race favourites 

The winner of the 2008 edition of the race, Alberto Contador, made his first Grand Tour appearance since his ban after testing positive for a banned substance at the 2010 Tour de France, and was considered by many the top favourite for overall victory. The then winner of the 2011 edition, Juan José Cobo, was looking to replicate his previous year's form after a disappointing 2012 season, and he was co-leader of the  alongside Alejandro Valverde.

Stages

Race overview 
For details see 2012 Vuelta a España, Stage 1 to Stage 11 and 2012 Vuelta a España, Stage 12 to Stage 21

Classification leadership table 
There were four main classifications contested in the 2012 Vuelta a España, with the most important being the general classification. The general classification was calculated by adding each cyclist's finishing times on each stage. The cyclist with the least accumulated time was the race leader, identified by the red jersey; the winner of this classification was considered the winner of the Vuelta. In 2012, there were time bonuses given on mass-start stages; twelve seconds were awarded to the stage winner, with eight for second and four for third.

Additionally, there was a points classification, which awards a green jersey. In the points classification, cyclists get points for finishing among the best in a stage finish, or in intermediate sprints. The cyclist with the most points led the classification, and is identified with a green jersey. There was also a mountains classification. The organisation categorised some climbs as either hors catégorie, first, second, third, or fourth-category; points for this classification were won by the first cyclists that reach the top of these climbs, with more points available for the higher-categorised climbs. The cyclist with the most points led the classification, and was identified with a blue polka dot jersey.

The fourth individual classification was the combination classification, marked by the white jersey. This classification is calculated by adding the numeral ranks of each cyclist in the general, points and mountains classifications – a rider must have a score in all classifications possible to qualify for the combination classification – with the lowest cumulative total signifying the winner of this competition.

For the team classification, the times of the best three cyclists per team on each stage were added; the leading team is the team with the lowest total time. For the combativity award, a jury gives points after each stage to the cyclists they considered most combative. The cyclist with the most votes in all stages leads the classification. For the daily combative winner, the rider in question donned a dossard with a red background, on the following stage.

Notes
 In stage 3, Javier Aramendia, who was second in the combination classification, wore the white jersey, because Javier Chacón (in first place) wore the blue polka-dot jersey as leader of the mountains classification during that stage.
 In stage 4, John Degenkolb, who was second in the points classification, wore the green jersey, because Alejandro Valverde (in first place) wore the red jersey as leader of the general classification during that stage. As well as that, Joaquim Rodríguez, who was second in the combination classification, wore the white jersey as Valverde also holds the lead of that classification.
 In stage 5, Pim Ligthart, who was second in the mountains classification, wore the blue polka-dot jersey, because Simon Clarke (in first place) wore the green jersey as leader of the points classification during that stage. As well as that, Alejandro Valverde, who was second in the combination classification wore the white jersey as Joaquim Rodríguez wore the red jersey as leader of the general classification.
 In stages 6, 7 and 8, Alejandro Valverde, who was second in the combination classification wore the white jersey as Joaquim Rodríguez (in first place) wore the red jersey as leader of the general classification.
 In stages 9, 10 and 11, Chris Froome, who was third in the combination classification wore the white jersey as Joaquim Rodríguez (in first place) wore the red jersey as leader of the general classification, and Alejandro Valverde (in second place) wore the blue polka-dot jersey as leader of the mountains classification.
 In stage 10, John Degenkolb, who was second in the points classification wore the green jersey as Joaquim Rodríguez (in first place) wore the red jersey as leader of the general classification.
 In stages 12, 13 and 14, Alberto Contador, who was third in the combination classification wore the white jersey as Joaquim Rodríguez (in first place) wore the red jersey as leader of the general classification, and Alejandro Valverde (in second place) wore the blue polka-dot jersey as leader of the mountains classification.
 In stage 13, John Degenkolb, who was third in the points classification wore the green jersey as Joaquim Rodríguez (in first place) wore the red jersey as leader of the general classification, and Alejandro Valverde (in second place) wore the blue polka-dot jersey as leader of the mountains classification. In stage 14, Degenkolb still wore the green jersey, as the second-placed rider in the points classification.
 In stages 15, 16 and 17, Alejandro Valverde, who was second in the points classification, wore the green jersey, as Joaquim Rodríguez (in first place) wore the red jersey as leader of the general classification and Alberto Contador, who was third in the combination classification, wore the white jersey.
 In stages 18 and 19, Alejandro Valverde, who is second in the combination classification, will wear the white jersey, as Joaquim Rodríguez (in first place) will wear the green jersey as leader of the points classification.

Standings

General classification

Points classification

King of the Mountains classification

Combination classification

Team classification

References

External links 

 

 
2012
1
2012 UCI World Tour